Karol Stuchlák (born 13 November 1990) is a Slovak luger.

Stuchlák was born in Poprad, Czechoslovakia, and competed at the 2014 Winter Olympics for Slovakia. In the Doubles he competed with Marek Solčanský, finishing 16th.

As of September 2014, Stuchlák's best performance at the FIL World Luge Championships is 20th, in the 2012 Championships.

As of September 2014, Stuchlák's best Luge World Cup overall finish is 14th in 2012–13.

References

External links
 

1990 births
Living people
Slovak male lugers
Lugers at the 2014 Winter Olympics
Lugers at the 2018 Winter Olympics
Olympic lugers of Slovakia
Sportspeople from Poprad